Daman Tehsil is the only tehsil (Taluk) of union territory Daman district located in western India. Daman is the headquarters of the tehsil and district.

Villages in Daman Tehsil 
Source:
 Daman
 Bhamati
 Bhimpore
 Dabhel
 Damanwada
 Deva Paradi
 Devaka
 Dholar
 Dunetha
 Jampor
 Nanivankad
 Kachigam
 Kadaiya
 Magarwada
 Marwad
 Nayala Paradi
 Palhit
 Pariyari
 Ringanwada
 Thana Paradi
 Varkund
 Zari

References 

Daman district, India
Tehsils of India